La Cocha Department is a department in Tucumán Province, Argentina. It has a population of 17,683 (2001) and an area of 917 km². The seat of the department is in La Cocha.

Municipalities and communes
El Sacrificio
Huasa Pampa
La Cocha
Rumi Punco
San Ignacio
San José de la Cocha
Yánima

Notes
This article includes content from the Spanish Wikipedia article Departamento La Cocha.

Departments of Tucumán Province